The City of Canterbury is a local government district with city status in Kent, England. As well as Canterbury itself, the district extends north to the coastal towns of Whistable and Herne Bay.

History
The district was formed on 1 April 1974 by the merger of the existing city of Canterbury with the Whitstable  and Herne Bay Urban Districts, and Bridge-Blean Rural District. The latter district entirely surrounded the city; the urban districts occupied the coastal area to the north.

Politics

Elections for to all seats on the city council are held every four years. After being under no overall control for a number of years, the Conservative party gained a majority in 2005 following a by election and defection from the Liberal Democrats.

Following the 2019 United Kingdom local elections the political composition of Canterbury council is as follows (2017 results follows by-elections):

Meeting place
After the Church of the Holy Cross, which was commissioned by Archbishop Simon Sudbury and completed before his death in 1381, was declared redundant and deconsecrated in 1972, it was acquired by the city council and converted for municipal use: it was officially re-opened by the Prince of Wales as the new Canterbury Guildhall and meeting place of the city council on 9 November 1978.

Geography
Within the district are the towns of Herne Bay and Whitstable, which, with the rural parishes and the cathedral city itself, make up the district of the City of Canterbury. There are 27 parishes within the district, as follows:
Adisham
Barham
Bekesbourne-with-Patrixbourne
Bishopsbourne
Blean
Bridge
Chartham
Chestfield
Chislet
Fordwich, which has town status
Hackington
Harbledown and Rough Common
Hersden
Herne and Broomfield
Hoath
Ickham
Kingston
Littlebourne
Lower Hardres and Nackington
Petham
Sturry
Thanington Without
Upper Hardres
Waltham
Westbere
Wickhambreaux
Womenswold

Swalecliffe is an unparished area within the district.

The district is largely rural, with a coastal strip taken up by the almost unbroken spread of seaside towns and beaches from Seasalter, west of Whitstable, to Herne Bay. Between them and the city the hills rise into the wooded area  of Blean, south of which the Great Stour flows from its source beyond Ashford.

Demography

Twin towns
The district participates in the Sister Cities programme, with 
links
to Bloomington-Normal, Illinois, and Vladimir, Russia.

The Three Towns Association was founded in 1985 on the initiative of three local clergymen to promote person-to-person contact between ordinary people in the UK, the U.S. and Russia. The name was subsequently changed to the Three Cities Association. The Association chose Vladimir as the twin city in Russia because it is the seat of Christianity in that country as Canterbury is the seat of Christianity in England. Vladimir was already twinned with Bloomington-Normal. Among other activities, the Association arranged home-stay exchanges between the two Simon Langton Schools in Canterbury and School No. 23 in Vladimir, where the teaching was conducted in English.

Several towns and villages within the City of Canterbury have their own twinning arrangements: see the articles on Canterbury, Whitstable and Herne Bay.

See also

 List of mayors of Canterbury

References

External links
Canterbury City Council

 
Cities in South East England
Non-metropolitan districts of Kent
Boroughs in England